Ngetkib is a village in Palau, and the capital of the state of Airai. It has a population of 62.

References

Populated places in Palau
Airai